The Hero Initiative, formerly known as A Commitment to Our Roots, or ACTOR, is the first federally recognized not-for-profit organization dedicated to helping comic book creators, writers and artists in need. Founded in late 2000 by a consortium of comic book and trade publishers, including Marvel Comics, Image Comics, Dark Horse Comics, Wizard Entertainment, CrossGen Comics and Dynamic Forces Inc., the 501(c)(3) charity aims to assist comic creators with health, medical, and quality-of-life assistance.

Eligibility
Many early comic creators, whose work laid the foundation of entire fictional universes that proved to be highly lucrative for the publishers that profit from them, were often paid little for their work, and were not allowed to keep their creations. According to the Hero Initiative, "to be eligible for financial assistance from Hero, an applicant must have been a working comic book writer, penciler, inker, colorist or letterer on a work-for-hire basis for no less than 10 years since January 1, 1934."

Anyone who meets the eligibility requirements may apply for aid, which could vary from medical assistance, paying rent, or finding employment (in or out of the comics industry). Hero's benefits are not meant to be a permanent crutch for needy creators, but assistance for those in debt, or who have trouble paying bills. Any granted aid is kept confidential.

Board of directors
The Hero Initiative has two boards of directors: the Executive Board and the Fund Disbursement Board.

The Executive Board, which handles fund raising and handles operations, comprises Hero Initiative President Jim McLauchlin, former editor-in-chief of Top Cow Comics; comics creator Brian Pulido; and Joe Quesada, editor-in-chief of Marvel Comics.  The board members are Steve Borock, president of the Comics Guaranty Corporation; former industry retailer Mike Malve; filmmaker Guillermo del Toro; and Beth Widera, owner of comic book convention MegaCon.  Former board members include founders Pat McCallum, editor-in-chief of Wizard Magazine; and Mike Richardson, publisher and founder of Dark Horse Comics.

The Fund Disbursement Board, who hear cases for aid and make all final decisions on whom to aid, act independent of the Executive Board, and is made up entirely of comics creators, writers, artists, and editors. They are (co-chairman) George Pérez, (co-chair) Roy Thomas, (board secretary) Charlie Novinskie, Dennis O'Neil, John Romita Sr., and Jim Valentino.

The charity is currently supported by Dark Horse Comics, Dynamic Forces, Image Comics, Marvel Entertainment, Top Cow Productions, and Wizard Entertainment.

Fundraising
The Hero Initiative utilizes many methods of fundraising. Foremost is their annual art auction, auctioning donated original comics art-work at fan conventions. Year-long, they sell donated art and special edition comics at conventions and through the Dynamic Forces website. Artists, writers, and publishers are invited to donate work, and fans are invited to donate money directly to the fund. ACTOR also sells a green Excelsior! wrist-band similar in design to the Livestrong wristband.

in 2017, the Arizona Comic Mini Expo held a Drink and Draw event to raise money for the Initiative.  Several professional comic book artists provided sketches to be exchanged for donations.  The money raised was split between the HERO Initiative and the ACLU of Arizona.

Name
The Hero Initiative was formerly known as A Commitment to Our Roots, or ACTOR, from its founding until September 2006. While the original name of the organization reflected the charity's goal, the acronym that resulted, ACTOR, more often confused people unfamiliar with the organization. In an effort to expand the marketability and fund-raising ability of the charity, the executive board decided to change the name to something more associated with comic books, thus the new name, Hero, named after the common and recognizable comic industry word Superhero.

Awards

Hero Initiative Lifetime Achievement Award 
 2006: George Pérez (1954–2022), John Romita, Sr. (1930–)
 2007: Joe Kubert (1926–2012)
 2008: Nick Cardy (1920–2013)
 2009: Neal Adams (1941–2022)
 2010: Walt Simonson (1946–)
 2011: Stan Lee (1922–2018)
 2012: John Romita, Jr. (1956–)
 2013: Sal Buscema (1936–)
 2014: Herb Trimpe (1939–2015)
 2015: Russ Heath (1926-2018)
 2016: Joe Giella (1928–)
 2017: Marv Wolfman (1946–)
 2018: Dennis O'Neil (1939–2020)
 2019: José Luis García-López (1948–)
 2020: No award presented due to the COVID-19 pandemic
 2021: Joe Quesada (1962–)

Dick Giordano Humanitarian of the Year Award 
In 2010, The Hero Initiative created The Dick Giordano Humanitarian of the Year Award, named after former board member Dick Giordano, who had died earlier in the year. The award recognizes one person in comics each year who demonstrates particular generosity and integrity in support of the overall comic book community. It debuted at the 2010 Harvey Awards ceremony held at the Baltimore Comic-Con. 
 2010: Tim Sale (1956–), Jerry Robinson (1922–2011)
 2011: Mike Gold (1950–)
 2012: Joe Kubert (1926–2012)
 2013: Paul Levitz (1956–)
 2014: Stan Goldberg (1932–2014)
 2015: Denis Kitchen (1946–)
 2016: Beth Widera (19??–)
 2017: Joshua Dysart (1971–)
 2018: Marc Andreyko (1970–)
 2019: Louise Simonson (1946–)
 2020: No award presented due to the COVID-19 pandemic
 2021: Gene Ha (19??–)

References

External links

  
Hero Initiative Merchandise
https://www.ebay.com
https://www.heroinitiative.org/merchandise
http://www.grahamcrackers.com/heroinitiative.htm
April 2007 Interview with Jim McLauchlin for Sequential Tart Webzine

Charities based in California
Comics-related organizations